Dysgammaglobulinemia is a type of immune disorder characterized by a reduction in some types of gamma globulins, resulting in heightened susceptibility to some infectious diseases where primary immunity is antibody based.

It is distinguished from hypogammaglobulinemia, which is a reduction in all types of gamma globulins.

Hyper IgM syndrome can be considered a form of dysgammaglobulinemia, because it results from a failure of transformation from IgM production to production of other antibodies, and so the condition can be interpreted as a reduction of the other types.

See also
Immunodeficiency

References

Further reading
 Raif S. Geha et al.: "Hyper Immunoglobulin M Immunodeficiency (Dysgammaglobulinemia)", Journal of Clinical Investigation, 1979 August; 64(2): 385–391, . Accessed 2009-07-17.
 Andre Cruchaud et al.: "The site of synthesis of the 19S T-globulins in dysgammaglobulinemia" (1962). Accessed 2009-07-17.

External links 

Predominantly antibody deficiencies